Ängö BK is a Swedish football club located in Kalmar.

Background
Ängö BK currently plays in Div 4 Elit Södra Småland sydöstra which is the fifth  tier of  Swedish football. They play their home matches at the Fredriksskans in Kalmar.

The club is affiliated to Smålands Fotbollförbund.

Footnotes

External links
 Ängö BK – Official website

Football clubs in Kalmar County